The Slingsby Hengist was a British military glider designed and built by Slingsby Sailplanes Ltd. Like other British troop carrying gliders in the Second World War, it was named after military figures whose name began with H, in this case the Jute invader Hengist.

Design and development

The use of assault gliders by the British was prompted by the use by Germany of the DFS 230 transport glider, which was first used in May 1940 to land assault troops on the Eben Emael fort in Belgium. Their advantage compared to parachute assault was that the troops landed in one place, rather than being dispersed.

The Slingsby T.18 Hengist was designed by John "Jack" Frost. It was a 15-seat glider designed to meet Specification X.25/40 (in accordance to O.R.98), issued in February 1941. The specification was issued in case sufficiently powerful tugs were not available for the larger Airspeed Horsa. Four prototypes were ordered in late 1940, the first prototype DG570 flying in January 1942, towed by an Armstrong Whitworth Whitley.

A total of 14 production Hengist Mk I were delivered to the Royal Air Force (RAF) between February 1943 and March 1944. One of Frost's unique design touches was to fit the Hengist with a rubber bag as a landing device. A strengthened undercarriage was used on the production aircraft and was called the Mk III, but this name was not carried over to the RAF.

The Hengist had a distinctive appearance with curved upper and lower surfaces and a flat sided fuselage.

Operational history
Two Hengist Mk Is were delivered to the Glider Pilots' Exercise Unit while others were issued to experimental units or remained in storage. Production was halted when Waco Hadrian gliders became available under lease-lend. As a back-up type, it saw no operational service and was phased out of service in 1946.

Specifications (Hengist Mk I)

See also

References

Notes

Bibliography

 Bishop, Chris. The Encyclopedia of Weapons of World War II: The Comprehensive Guide to Over 1,500 Weapons Systems, Including Tanks, Small Arms, Warplanes, Artillery, Ships and Submarines. New York: Sterling Publishing Company, Inc., 2002. . 
 Brown, Robert G. On the Edge: Personal Flying Experiences During the Second World War.  Renfrew, Ontario, Canada: General Store Publishing House, 1999. . 
 Ellison, Norman. British Gliders and Sailplanes. London: A & C Black ltd, 1971. .
 Flint, Keith. Airborne Armour: Tetrarch, Locust, Hamilcar and the 6th Airborne Armoured Reconnaissance Regiment 1938–1950. Solihull, W. Midlands, UK: Helion & Company Ltd, 2006. . 
 Lynch, Tim. Silent Skies: Gliders At War 1939–1945. Barnsley, UK: Pen & Sword Military, 2008. . 
 March, Daniel J. British Warplanes of World War II. London: Aerospace Publishing, 1998. . 
 Mondey, David. The Hamlyn Concise Guide to British Aircraft of World War II. London: Chancellor Press, 2002. .
 Munson, Kenneth. Aircraft of World War II. New York: Doubleday and Company, 1972. .
 Otway, Lieutenant-Colonel T.B.H. The Second World War 1939–1945 Army: Airborne Forces. London: Imperial War Museum, 1990. .
 Simons, Martin. Slingsby Sailplanes. London: Airlife Publishing Ltd, 1996. . 
 Smith, Claude. History of the Glider Pilot Regiment. London: Pen & Sword Aviation, 1992. .
 Swanborough, Gordon. British Aircraft at War, 1939–1945. East Sussex, UK: HPC Publishing, 1997. .
 Thetford, Owen. Aircraft of the Royal Air Force 1918–57. London: Putnam, 1968. .

1940s British military gliders
Glider aircraft
Hengist
Aircraft first flown in 1942
High-wing aircraft